SM UC-48 was a German Type UC II minelaying submarine or U-boat in the German Imperial Navy during World War I. The U-boat was ordered on 20 November 1915, laid down on 1 February 1916, and was launched on 27 September 1916. She was commissioned into the German Imperial Navy on 6 November 1916 as SM UC-48. In 13 patrols UC-48 was credited with sinking 35 ships, either by torpedo or by mines laid. Unable to return to Zeebrugge, the boat was steered to Ferrol, Spain, where she and her crew were interned for the rest of the war. The Spanish authorities removed UC-48s propellers to prevent any attempts at leaving port.

Design
A German Type UC II submarine, UC-48 had a displacement of  when at the surface and  while submerged.
The submarine was powered by two six-cylinder four-stroke diesel engines each producing  (a total of ), two electric motors producing , and two propeller shafts.

UC-48 was fitted with six  mine tubes,  eighteen UC 200 mines, three  torpedo tubes (one on the stern and two on the bow), seven torpedoes, and one  Uk L/30 deck gun. Her complement was twenty-six crew members.

Summary of raiding history

References

Notes

Citations

Bibliography

 
 

Ships built in Bremen (state)
German Type UC II submarines
U-boats commissioned in 1916
World War I minelayers of Germany
World War I submarines of Germany
1916 ships